Feuersville is an extinct town in Osage County, in the U.S. state of Missouri.

A post office called Feuersville was established in 1879, and remained in operation until 1916. The community has the name of the local Feuers family.

References

Ghost towns in Missouri
Former populated places in Osage County, Missouri